Dorcadion morozovi is a species of beetle in the family Cerambycidae. It was described by Mikhail Leontievich Danilevsky in 1992. It is known from Kazakhstan.

References

morozovi
Beetles described in 1992